This article is a list of the seasons completed by the National Hockey League (NHL)'s St. Louis Blues. This list documents the records and playoff results for all seasons the Blues have completed in the NHL since their inception in 1967.

Table key

Year by year

1 Season was shortened due to the 1994–95 NHL lockout.
2 As of the 2005–06 NHL season, all games will have a winner; the OTL column includes SOL (Shootout losses).
3 Season was shortened due to the 2012–13 NHL lockout.
4 The 2019–20 NHL season was suspended on March 12, 2020 due to the COVID-19 pandemic.
5 Due to the COVID-19 pandemic, the 2020–21 NHL season was shortened to 56 games.

All-time records

References

 St. Louis Blues season statistics and records @ hockeydb.com

St. Louis Blues
seasons